The Federal Association of Liberal Students Groups (German: Bundesverband Liberaler Hochschulgruppen; short: LHG) is a student association in the Federal Republic of Germany supporting liberal political issues.

The LHG was founded in 1987, by a combination of 40 student groups, as a successor association of several liberal student associations, including the center-left Social Liberal Student Association (SLH), the Young Liberals Student Association (JuLi-Hochschulgruppen), and the Liberal Students' Initiative (LSI). 

The LHG is the first comprehensive federal association of liberal students in Germany since the breakup of the Liberal Students' Alliance (LSD), once associated with the FDP in 1969.

The LHG is a full member of the European Liberal Youth (LYMEC), which itself is tied to the European Liberal Democrat and Reform Party in the European Union.

Consisting of currently 65 member groups, LHG is one of the largest German student association. Since its digital convention in January 2022, the federal chairman has been Benjamin Kurtz.

Former chairpersons 
 Inka Goos-Richter (1987–89)
 Peter Kuhlmeier (1989)
 Lukas Werner (1989–91)
 Beate Engelhardt (1991–92)
 Christian Etzrodt (1992)
 Bernd-Alfred Bartels (1992–94)
 Knut Wuhler (1994–95)
 Carl Sonnenschein (1995–96)
 Gunnar Pietsch (1996–97)
 Britta Paulekat (1997–1998)
 Sandra von Münster (1998–2000)
 Raoul Michael Koether (2000–02)
 Marcel Luthe (2002–04)
 Martin Hörig (2004–06)
 Götz Galuba (2006–07)
 Daniel George (2007–09)
 Johannes Knewitz (2009–11)
 Kristina Kämpfer (2011-12)
 Josephine Dietzsch (2012-2014)
 Julia Buschhorn (2014-2015)
 Sascha Lucas (2015-2015)
 Alexander Schopf (2015-2016)
 Johannes Dallheimer (2016-2019)
 Lukas Tiltmann (2019-2020)
 Tabea Gandelheidt (2020-2022)
 Benjamin Kurtz (since 2022)

References

External links 
 Homepage of LHG

Student wings of political parties in Germany
Student wings of liberal parties
Free Democratic Party (Germany)
Student organizations established in 1987